Route 989, or Highway 989, may refer to:

Australia
C989 - Wells Road (Victoria)

United Kingdom
 A989

United States